Mesta Park is a residential neighborhood in Oklahoma City, Oklahoma which is also listed as a historic district on the National Register of Historic Places. The listing is roughly bounded by NW 16th and 23rd Sts. and Western and Walker Avenues.

The area was built in stages during 1906 to 1930, with about half completed by 1915.

References

Historic districts on the National Register of Historic Places in Oklahoma
National Register of Historic Places in Oklahoma County, Oklahoma
Neoclassical architecture in Oklahoma
Mission Revival architecture in Oklahoma